Events in the year 2022 in the Gambia.

Incumbents 
 President: Adama Barrow
 Vice-President of the Gambia: Isatou Touray (until 4 May, 2022); Badara Joof onwards
 Chief Justice: Hassan Bubacar Jallow

Events 

Ongoing — COVID-19 pandemic in the Gambia

 3 August – Two people are killed after heavy flooding in The Gambia.
 9 October – An investigation is launched in the Gambia into the deaths of 66 children during the past three months, which have been linked to four brands of imported cough syrup.
 21 December - Four soldiers are arrested after an alleged coup attempt the previous day.

Deaths 
 20 February – Dawda Fadera, diplomat, ambassador to the United States.

References 

 
Gambia
Gambia
2020s in the Gambia
Years of the 21st century in the Gambia